Bradley Ira Fiedel (born March 10, 1951) is an American composer of scores for film and television. He is well known for his collaborations with director James Cameron on The Terminator (1984) and its blockbuster sequel, Terminator 2: Judgment Day (1991), as well as the action-comedy True Lies (1994). On these scores he mostly used synthesizers, but composed a number of scores utilizing various acoustic instruments, including full orchestra. 

Fiedel's work includes other films in the genres of science fiction, action and horror, such as Fright Night (1985) and sequel Fright Night Part 2 (1988), The Serpent and the Rainbow (1988) and Johnny Mnemonic (1995). He also scored a number of comedy films, such as Compromising Positions (1985) and Fraternity Vacation (1985), as well as drama films including The Accused (1988), Blue Steel (1990) and Rasputin: Dark Servant of Destiny (1996).

He retired from scoring films in the late 1990s and now focuses primarily on creating original musicals.

Biography
Raised in Bayville, New York on Long Island, Fiedel graduated from The Barlow School. After college, he became a popular and progressive composer. In the 1980s, he worked on several successful movies, predominantly in the action and thriller genres, and pioneered the use of electronic instruments and synthesizers in soundtracks. However, he almost disappeared from the mainstream at the end of the 1990s. In the early 70's Fiedel was signed as a songwriter to Paul Simon's DeShufflin' Music. In the mid 70's he spent six months as the keyboardist for Hall and Oates.

He began his career in film in the mid 1970s, and wrote extensively for television films including Playing for Time written by Arthur Miller starring Vanessa Redgrave and Jane Alexander, and some independent cinema releases, until director James Cameron hired him to score the science fiction film The Terminator in 1984, setting the wheels in motion for a successful career.

Since then, Fiedel has scored many popular and successful movies, including Fright Night (1985) and its sequel Fright Night Part 2 (1988), The Big Easy (1987), The Serpent and the Rainbow (1988), The Accused (1988), Blue Steel (1990), Terminator 2: Judgment Day (1991), Blink (1994), and True Lies (1994). 
He also composed the Lightstorm Entertainment logo jingle.

In recent years, Fiedel moved on to other creative areas, writing original musicals, and designing and building a surf resort in La Saladita, Mexico. 

His last major theatrical score was in 1995, and although he enjoyed a brief period of renewed interest following the release of Terminator 3: Rise of the Machines in 2003, when Marco Beltrami wrote an orchestral arrangement of his theme, he shows no sign of returning to the film music field. He recently released an audio version of his original musical Full Circle.

Family

Fiedel has been married to actress Ann Dusenberry since 1975; the couple have two daughters named Alixandra and Zoe; they live in Santa Barbara, California.

Filmography

 Apple Pie (1975)
 Deadly Hero (1975)
 Damien’s Island (1976)
 Looking Up (1977)
 Mayflower: The Pilgrims' Adventure (1979, TV movie)
 Hardhat and Legs (1979)
 The Day the Women Got Even (1980, TV movie)
 Playing for Time (1980, TV movie)
 Dream House (1981, TV movie)
 The Bunker (1981, CBS TV movie)
 Night School (1981)
 Just Before Dawn (1981)
 Mae West (1982, TV movie)
 Dreams Don’t Die (1982, TV movie)
 Born Beautiful (1982, TV movie)
 Murder in Coweta County (1983, TV movie)
 Cocaine: One Man's Seduction (1983, TV movie)
 Eyes of Fire (1983)
 Right of Way (1983, TV movie)
 Jacobo Timerman: Prisoner Without a Name, Cell Without a Number (1983, TV movie)
 Girls of the White Orchid (1983, TV movie)
 Heart of Steel (1983, TV movie)
 When She Says No (1984, TV movie)
 Anatomy Of An Illness (1984, TV movie)
 The Baron and the Kid (1984, TV movie)
 Children in the Crossfire (1984, TV movie)
 The Three Wishes of Billy Grier (1984, TV movie)
 Calendar Girl Murders (1984, TV movie)
 The Terminator (1984)
 Fraternity Vacation (1985)
 Fright Night (1985)
 Compromising Positions (1985)
 The Midnight Hour (1985)
 Deadly Messages (1985, TV movie)
 Into Thin Air (1985, TV movie)
 Popeye Doyle (1986, TV movie)
 Desert Bloom (1986)
 Let's Get Harry (1986)
 The Big Easy (1986)
 Under Siege (1986, TV movie)
 The Brotherhood of Justice (1986, TV movie)
 Second Serve (1986, TV movie)
 Of Pure Blood (1986, TV movie)
 Nowhere to Hide (1987)
 Weekend War (1987, TV movie)
 The Last Innocent Man (1987, TV movie)
 Bluffing It (1987, TV movie)
 Right to Die (1987, TV movie)
 The Serpent and the Rainbow (1988)
 Fright Night Part 2 (1988)
 The Accused (1988)
 Hostage (1988, TV movie)
 Hot Paint (1988, TV movie)
 Bluffing It (1988, TV movie)
 Perfect Witness (1989, TV movie)
 True Believer (1989)
 Immediate Family (1989)
 Cold Sassy Tree (1989, TV movie)
 Blue Steel (1990)
 Night Visions (1990, TV movie)
 Forgotten Prisoners: The Amnesty Files (1990, TV movie)
 Plymouth (1991)
 Blood Ties (1991, TV movie)
 Terminator 2: Judgment Day (1991)
 Teamster Boss: The Jackie Presser Story (1992)
 Gladiator (1992)
 Straight Talk (1992)
 The Real McCoy (1993)
 Striking Distance (1993)
 Blink (1993)
 True Lies (1994)
 Johnny Mnemonic (1995)
 Eden (1996)
 Rasputin: Dark Servant of Destiny (1996)
 Mistrial (1996, TV movie)
 Eden (1999)
 Y2K (1999)

References

External links

Movie Music UK biography

1951 births
American film score composers
American television composers
Hall & Oates members
Living people
American male film score composers
Male television composers
Musicians from New York City
People from Bayville, New York
Varèse Sarabande Records artists